Word Monsters is a word puzzle video game developed by Raketspel and was published by Rovio Stars. However, as of the middle of 2014 the game is published by Raketspel and is no longer published by Rovio Stars. The iOS release was on 27 March 2014 and the Android release was on 7 May 2014. As of 2021, the game is no longer available on the App Store or Google Play Store.

Gameplay
The game features creating a custom monster and finding all the words on the screen under a specific time limit.  The player may play challenges against their in-game friends or against players worldwide.

Episodes

Reception
The game has received average reviews with a Metacritic score of 69/100 based on 6 reviews.

References

2014 video games
IOS games
Android (operating system) games
Puzzle video games
Word games
Video games developed in Sweden
Rovio Entertainment games